Weikendorf is a town in the district of Gänserndorf in the State of Lower Austria, in northeast Austria.

Population

References

External links 
 Municipal website

Cities and towns in Gänserndorf District